Strike Social is a advertising & marketing company headquartered in Chicago that uses artificial intelligence for online advertising and paid social campaigns through a Software as a service (Saas) model.

History 
Strike Social was founded in 2013 in Los Angeles by Patrick McKenna, Mark Shore, and Tim Helfrey.

Strike Social moved its headquarters to Chicago in 2015 and is the largest third-party advertising and intelligence firm in the world. According to Inc. (magazine) in 2017, Strike Social was listed as the 17th fastest growing private company in the United States and fastest growing company in all of Chicago. In 2018 Inc., listed Strike Social again on the list as No. 165 fastest-growing company in the United States.

Employees and locations 
Strike Social employs 120 people in offices worldwide, including the United States, Poland, and Philippines.

Awards 
2017 Inc. 500: No. 17 Fastest-Growing Private Company in the United States.

References

External links

Advertising agencies of the United States
Companies based in Chicago